The 1892 Historical American Exposition held in Madrid was intended to mark the four hundredth year of the discovery of America.

Participants
Several countries  including
Argentina,
Bolivia,
Colombia, 
Costa Rica, Denmark, 
Dominican Republic, 
Ecuador, 
Germany, 
Guatemala, 
Mexico, 
Nicaragua, Norway,
Peru, Portugal, 
Sweden, 
Uruguay and USA  
participated, along with the Captaincy General of Cuba and Spain herself.

Costa Rica
The Costa Rica exhibit was organised by the National Museum of Costa Rica director Anastasio Alfaro and included over 1000 relics from an 1891 excavation of a cemetery at Guayabo de Turrialba. After the Madrid exhibition, much of the Costa Rican display was taken to the 1893 World's Columbian Exposition in Chicago.

Mexico
The Mexican exhibit was curated by Francisco del Paso y Troncoso   and included models of the El Tajín, Xochicalco, and Teuchitlan pyramids and of the complete Cempoala site.

Spain
The Spanish section had many artefacts loaned from the National Archaeological Museum of Spain including the Troano codex

See also
 Exposición Nacional de Minería (1883)

References

1892 establishments in Spain
1893 disestablishments in Spain
19th century in Madrid
World's fairs in Spain
Events in Madrid